Marlize de Bruin (born 11 November 1994) is a South African rugby sevens player. She represented South Africa at the 2022 Rugby World Cup Sevens in Cape Town.

References 

Living people
1994 births
Female rugby sevens players
South Africa international women's rugby sevens players